Dunleary is an unincorporated community and coal town in Pike County, Kentucky, United States. The Dunleary  post office  is closed.

References

Unincorporated communities in Pike County, Kentucky
Unincorporated communities in Kentucky
Coal towns in Kentucky